Mom Rinker's Rock is a scenic outlook in Wissahickon Valley Park along the Wissahickon Creek in the city of Philadelphia, Pennsylvania, United States. It is located on a ridge on the eastern side of the park just a little north of the Walnut Lane Bridge, close by the statue dedicated to Toleration.

The name of the outlook is derived from legendary stories about an event that supposedly occurred during or after the American Revolutionary War Battle of Germantown; the stories tell of American spies taking advantage of the rugged terrain of the Wissahickon valley to retrieve information from an informant named Molly Rinker (nicknamed "Mom Rinker"), who allegedly perched atop a rock overlooking the valley to drop balls of yarn which contained messages about British troop movements during the occupation of Philadelphia. Other stories speak of a witch named Mom Rinkle who had little to do with the Revolutionary War. History allows that the American General John Armstrong, compelled by the rough terrain to abandon a cannon in the valley, did express his contempt for the "horrendous hills of the Wissahickon" over which Mom Rinker's Rock stands today.

Here on May 15, 1847, the evening of a new moon, the American novelist, journalist, playwright, social activist, and labour organizer George Lippard was married to his frail young wife. Years afterward in 1883, a statue dedicated to Toleration was erected, a marble statue of a man in simple Quaker clothing; the nine-foot eight-inch statue has but the single word “Toleration” carved into its four-foot three-inch base. The statue was created by late 19th-century sculptor Herman Kirn, and brought to the site by landowner John Welsh, reported to have purchased the statue at the 1876 Centennial Exposition in Philadelphia. Welsh, a former Fairmount Park Commissioner and U.S. Ambassador to Britain, donated his land to the Park prior to his death in 1886.

External links
1871 map of Fairmount and Wissahickon Park locating Mom Rickle's Rock
1876 map of Fairmount and Wissahickon Park locating Mom Rinkle's Rock
photos of the statue Toleration atop Mom Rinker's Rock

References 

Wissahickon Valley Park
Scenic viewpoints in the United States